Persian domes or Iranian domes have an ancient origin and a history extending to the modern era. The use of domes in ancient Mesopotamia was carried forward through a succession of empires in the Greater Iran region. 

An ancient tradition of royal audience tents representing the heavens was translated into monumental stone and brick domes due to the invention of the squinch, a reliable method of supporting the circular base of a heavy dome upon the walls of a square chamber. Domes were built as part of royal palaces, castles, caravansaries, and temples, among other structures. 

With the introduction of Islam in the 7th century, mosque and mausoleum architecture also adopted and developed these forms. Structural innovations included pointed domes, drums, conical roofs, double and triple shells, and the use of muqarnas and bulbous forms. Decorative brick patterning, interlaced ribs, painted plaster, and colorful tiled mosaics were used to decorate the exterior as well as the interior surfaces.

Characteristics 
Persian domes from different historical eras can be distinguished by their transition tiers: the squinches, spandrels, or brackets that transition from the supporting structures to the circular base of a dome. Drums, after the Ilkanate era, tend to be very similar and have an average height of 30 to 35 meters from the ground. They are where windows are located. Inner shells are commonly semi-circular, semi-elliptical, pointed, or saucer shaped. The outer shell of a Persian dome reduces in thickness every 25 or 30 degrees from the base. Outer shells can be semi-circular, semi-elliptical, pointed, conical, or bulbous, and this outer shape is used to categorize them. Pointed domes can be sub-categorized as having shallow, medium, and sharp profiles, and bulbous domes as either shallow or sharp. Double domes use internal stiffeners with wooden struts between the shells, with the exception of those with conical outer shells.

Pre-Islamic period 
Persian architecture likely inherited an architectural tradition of dome-building dating back to the earliest Mesopotamian domes. In Central Asia, mudbrick domes have been documented as far back as the late third millennium BC. Buildings with domes made of un-fired bricks have been found at fourth century BC sites at Balandy 2 and Koj Krylgan kala in Khorezm. Due to the scarcity of wood in many areas of the Iranian plateau, domes were an important part of vernacular architecture throughout Persian history.

Achaemenid Empire 
Although they had palaces of brick and stone, the kings of Achaemenid Persia held audiences and festivals in domical tents derived from the nomadic traditions of central Asia. They were likely similar to the later tents of the Mongol Khans. Called "Heavens", these tents emphasized the cosmic significance of the divine ruler. They were adopted by Alexander the Great after his conquest of the empire, and the domed baldachin of Roman and Byzantine practice was presumably inspired by this association.

Parthian Empire 
The remains of a large domed circular hall measuring 17 meters in diameter in the Parthian capital city of Nyssa has been dated to perhaps the first century AD. It "shows the existence of a monumental domical tradition in Central Asia that had hitherto been unknown and which seems to have preceded Roman Imperial monuments or at least to have grown independently from them." It likely had a wooden dome. The room "contained a portrait of Mithradates II and, along with other structures at the site, hosted some sort of cult activities connected to the memory of the kings of kings."

The Sun Temple at Hatra appears to indicate a transition from columned halls with trabeated roofing to vaulted and domed construction in the first century AD, at least in Mesopotamia. The domed sanctuary hall of the temple was preceded by a barrel vaulted iwan, a combination that would be used by the subsequent Persian Sasanian Empire.

A bulbous Parthian dome can be seen in the relief sculpture of the Arch of Septimius Severus in Rome, its shape apparently due to the use of a light tent-like framework.

An account of a Parthian domed palace hall from around 100 AD in the city of Babylon can be found in the Life of Apollonius of Tyana by Philostratus. The hall was used by the king for passing judgments and was decorated with a mosaic of blue stone to resemble the sky, with images of gods in gold. It may have been an audience tent; Philostratus described the ceiling as "constructed in the form of a dome like the heavens."

Sasanian Empire 

Caravansaries used the domed bay from the Sasanian period to the Qajar dynasty. The Persian invention of the squinch, a series of concentric arches forming a half-cone over the corner of a room, enabled the transition from the walls of a square chamber to an octagonal base for a dome. Previous transitions to a dome from a square chamber existed but were makeshift in quality and only attempted on a small scale, not being reliable enough for large constructions. The squinch enabled domes to be widely used and they moved to the forefront of Persian architecture as a result. 

The ruins of the Palace of Ardashir and Ghal'eh Dokhtar in Fars Province, Iran, built by Ardashir I (224–240) of the Sasanian Empire, have the earliest known examples of squinches. The three domes of the Palace of Ardashir are 45 feet in diameter and vertically elliptical, each with a central opening or oculus to admit light. They were built with local stone and mortar and covered with plaster on the interior. At the center of the palace of Shahpur, at Bishapur, there is a vertically-elliptical dome that rests directly on the ground and is dated to 260. The large brick dome of the Sarvestan Palace, also in Fars but later in date, shows more elaborate decoration and four windows between the corner squinches. Also called "the Temple of Anahita", the building may have been a Fire temple. Instead of using a central oculus in each dome, as at the Palace of Ardashir and as shown in the bas relief found at Kuyunjik, lighting was provided by a number of hollow terracotta cylinders set into the domes at regular intervals. 

Multiple written accounts from Arabic, Byzantine, and Western medieval sources describe a palace domed structure over the throne of Chosroes decorated in blue and gold. The dome was covered with depictions of the sun, moon, stars, planets, the zodiac, astrapai, and kings, including Chosroes himself. According to Ado and others, the dome could produce rain, and could be rotated with a sound like thunder by means of ropes pulled by horses in a basement. The castle of Qasr-e Shirin had a domed chamber at the end of a long barrel-vaulted iwan. The late-Sasanian Tāq-i Kasrā in Ctesiphon may also have led to a domed throne room.

Chahar-taqi, or "four vaults", were smaller Zoroastrian fire temple structures with four supports arranged in a square, connected by four arches, and covered by central ovoid domes. The Niasar Zoroastrian temple in Kashan and the chahar-taqi in Darreh Shahr are examples. They are numerous throughout the province of Pars, possibly starting from the early Sasanian empire, and are known to be part of the palatial architecture of Ardashir I. Such temples, square domed buildings with entrances at the axes, inspired the forms of early mosques after the Islamic conquest of the empire in the 7th century. These domes are the most numerous surviving type from the Sasanian period, with some having been converted into mosques. The later isolated dome chambers called the "kiosk mosque" type may have developed from this. Pre-Islamic domes in Persia are commonly semi-elliptical, with pointed domes and those with conical outer shells being the majority of the domes in the Islamic periods.

Although the Sasanians did not create monumental tombs, the domed chahar-taqi may have served as memorials. A Soghdian painting fragment from the early eighth century found at Panjakent appears to depict a funerary dome (possibly a tent) and this, along with a few ossuaries of an architectural nature, indicates a possible tradition in central Asia of a funerary association with the domed form. The area of north-eastern Iran was, along with Egypt, one of two areas notable for early developments in Islamic domed mausoleums, which appear in the tenth century.

Islamic period

Early Islamic period 

The earliest known Islamic domes in Persia, such as the Great Mosque of Qom (878) and the tomb of Muhammed b. Musa (976), seem to have continued the rounded Sasanian form. Domed mausoleums contributed greatly to the development and spread of the dome in Persia early in the Islamic period. By the 10th century, domed tombs had been built for Abbasid caliphs and Shiite martyrs. Pilgrimage to these sites may have helped to spread the form.

The earliest surviving example in Islamic architecture, the Qubbat-al Sulaibiya, was an octagonal structure with a central dome on a drum built around 892 in Samarra on the Tigris. Free-standing domed pavilions are known from Shiraz and Bukhara in the tenth century. The Samanid Mausoleum in Transoxiana dates to no later than 943 and is the first to have squinches create a regular octagon as a base for the dome, which then became the standard practice. The Arab-Ata Mausoleum, also in Transoxiana, may be dated to 977–78 and uses muqarnas between the squinches for a more unified transition to the dome. Cylindrical or polygonal plan tower tombs with conical roofs over domes also exist beginning in the 11th century. The earliest example is the Gonbad-e Qabus tower tomb, 57 meters high and spanning 9.7 meters, which was built in 1007.

Seljuq dynasty 

The Seljuq Turks built tower tombs, called "Turkish Triangles", as well as cube mausoleums covered with a variety of dome forms. Seljuk domes included conical, semi-circular, and pointed shapes in one or two shells. Shallow semi-circular domes are mainly found from the Seljuk era. The double-shell domes were either discontinuous or continuous. The continuous double-shell domes separated from one another at an angle of 22.5 degrees from their base, such as the dome of the Friday mosque in Ardestan, whereas the discontinuous domes remained completely separate, such as those of the tower tombs of Kharrqan. This pair of brick tower tombs from the 11th century in Kharraqan, Iran, are the earliest known masonry double shell domes. The domes may have been modeled on earlier wooden double shell domes, such as that of the Dome of the Rock. It is also possible, because the upper portions of both of the outer shells are missing, that some portion of the outer domes may have been wooden. These brick mausoleum domes were built without the use of centering, a technique developed in Persia.

The Seljuq Empire introduced the domed enclosure in front of the mosque's mihrab, which would become popular in Persian congregational mosques, although domed rooms may have also been used earlier in small neighborhood mosques. The domed enclosure of the Jameh Mosque of Isfahan, built in 1086-7 by Nizam al-Mulk, was the largest masonry dome in the Islamic world at that time, had eight ribs, and introduced a new form of corner squinch with two quarter domes supporting a short barrel vault. In 1088 Tāj-al-Molk, a rival of Nizam al-Mulk, built another dome at the opposite end of the same mosque with interlacing ribs forming five-pointed stars and pentagons. This is considered the landmark Seljuk dome, and may have inspired subsequent patterning and the domes of the Il-Khanate period. The use of tile and of plain or painted plaster to decorate dome interiors, rather than brick, increased under the Seljuks. One of the largest Seljuq domes, built over the site of a Sassanian Fire Temple, was that of the Jameh Mosque of Qazvin with a span of 15.2 meters. The largest Seljuq domed chamber was the Tomb of Ahmed Sanjar, which had a large double shell, intersecting ribs over plain squinches, and an exterior elaborately decorated at the zone of transition with arches and stucco work. The tomb of Sultan Sanjar, who reigned from 1117 to 1157, was damaged in the sack of Merv in 1221 by Tolui Khan.

The Ilkhanate 
After the disruptive effects of several Mongol invasions, Persian architecture again flourished in the Ilkhanate and Timurid periods. Characteristic of these domes are the use of high drums and several types of discontinuous double-shells, and the development of triple-shells and internal stiffeners occurred at this time. Beginning in the Ilkanate, Persian domes achieved their final configuration of structural supports, zone of transition, drum, and shells, and subsequent evolution was restricted to variations in form and shell geometry. The construction of tomb towers decreased.

The two major domes of the IlKhanate period are the no-longer-existing mausoleum of Ghazan in Tabriz and the Mausoleum of Öljaitü in Soltaniyeh, the latter having been built to rival the former. Öljaitü was the first sovereign of Persia to declare himself of the Shia sect of Islam and built the mausoleum, with the largest Persian dome, to house the bodies of Ali and Hussein as a pilgrimage site. This did not occur and it became his own mausoleum instead. The dome measures 50 meters high and almost 25 meters in diameter and has the best surviving tile and stucco work from this period. The thin, double-shelled dome was reinforced by arches between the layers. The dome has been proposed as an influence on the design of that of Florence Cathedral, built a century later. The mausoleum is the only remaining important building to survive from Öljaitü's capital city.

Tower tombs of this period, such as the tomb of Abdas-Samad Esfahani in Natanz, sometimes have muqarnas domes, although they are usually plaster shells that hide the underlying structures. The tall proportions of the Jameh Mosque of Varamin resulted primarily from the increased height of the zone of transition, with the addition of a sixteen-sided section above the main zone of muqarnas squinches. The 7.5 meter wide double dome of Soltan Bakht Agha Mausoleum (1351–1352) is the earliest known example in which the two shells of the dome have significantly different profiles, which spread rapidly throughout the region. The inner and outer shells had radial stiffeners and struts between them. An early example of a dome chamber almost completely covered with decorative tilework is that of the Jame Mosque of Yazd (1364), as well as several of the mausoleums of Shah-i-Zinda in Samarkand. The development of taller drums also continued into the Timurid period.

Timurid dynasty 
At the Timurid capital of Samarkand, nobles and rulers in the 14th and 15th centuries began building tombs with double-shelled domes containing cylindrical masonry drums between the shells. In the Gur-e Amir, built by Timur around 1404, a timber framework on the inner dome supports the outer, bulbous dome. Radial tie-bars at the base of the bulbous dome provide additional structural support. Timber reinforcement rings and rings of stone linked by iron cramps were also used to compensate for the structural problems introduced by using such drums. Radial sections of brick walls with wooden struts were used between the shells of discontinuous double domes to provide structural stability as late at the 14th century.

The large dome of Bibi-Khanym Mosque in Samarkand was damaged by an earthquake during Timur's lifetime.

An account by ambassador Ruy González de Clavijo describes a huge square Timurid pavilion tent with a dome at the top that resembled a castle from a distance due to its size. It measured one hundred paces on a side and was assembled from tall wooden masts stayed by ropes, with silk curtains between them. The tent had four archways and was surrounded by a lower attached portico or gallery on all four sides.

A miniature painted at Samarkand shows that bulbous cupolas were used to cover small wooden pavilions in Persia by the beginning of the fifteenth century. They gradually gained in popularity. The large, bulbous, fluted domes on tall drums that are characteristic of 15th century Timurid architecture were the culmination of the Central Asian and Iranian tradition of tall domes with glazed tile coverings in blue and other colors. The Mausoleum of Khoja Ahmed Yasawi, situated in southern Kazakhstan was never finished, but has the largest existing brick dome in Central Asia, measuring 18.2 m in diameter. The dome exterior is covered with hexagonal green glazed tiles with gold patterns.

Mausoleums were rarely built as free-standing structures after the 14th century, being instead often attached to madrasas in pairs. Domes of these madrasas, such as those of the madrasa of Gawhar Shad (1417–1433) and the madrasa at Ḵargerd (1436–1443), had dramatically innovative interiors. They used intersecting arches to support an inner dome narrower than the floor below, a change that may have originated with the 14th century use of small lantern domes over transverse vaulting. The madrasa of Gawhar Shad is also the first triple-shell dome. The middle dome may have been added as reinforcement. Triple-shelled domes are rare outside of the Timurid era. The dome of the Amir Chakhmaq mosque (1437) has a semi-circular inner shell and an advanced system of stiffeners and wooden struts supporting a shallow pointed outer shell. Notably, the dome has a circular drum with two tiers. Another double shell dome from the early Seljuq period at the shrine complex of Bayazid Bastami was changed in the Timurid period by the addition of a third conical shell over the existing two domed shells.

The Uzbek architecture of the region around Transoxiana maintained the Timurid style of dome-building. Where dome chambers were surrounded by axial iwans and corner rooms on an octagonal plan, as at the Khwaja Abu Nasr Parsa shrine (ca. 1598), they provided the model for Indian mausoleums such as Humayun's Tomb in Delhi or the Taj Mahal. Some of the earliest surviving domed markets, called tīmcās, can be found in Shaybanid-era Bukhara.

Safavid dynasty 
The domes of the Safavid dynasty (1501–1732) are characterized by a distinctive bulbous profile and are considered to be the last generation of Persian domes. They are generally thinner than earlier domes and are decorated with a variety of colored glazed tiles and complex vegetal patterns. The dome of the Blue Mosque in Tabriz (1465) had its interior covered with "dark-blue hexagonal tiles with stenciled gilding". The palace of Ālī Qāpū includes small domed rooms decorated with artificial vegetation.

The removal of thousands of Armenian Christians to the Isfahan suburb city of New Julfa by Shah Abbas resulted in the "unusual sight of Ṣafawid-style domes topped by a cross" in that city.

The dome of Sheikh Lotfollah Mosque in Isfahan (1603–1618), perhaps "the quintessential Persian dome chamber", blends the square room with the zone of transition and uses plain squinches like those of the earlier Seljuq period. On the exterior, multiple levels of glazed arabesque are blended with an unglazed brick background. The domes of the Shah Mosque (later renamed the Imam Mosque) and the Mādar-e Šāh madrasa have a similar exterior pattern against a background of light blue glazed tile. The bulbous dome of the Shah Mosque was built from 1611 to 1638 and is a discontinuous double-shell 33 meters wide and 52 meters high. The oldest example of the Safavid onion dome is over the octagonal mausoleum of Khwaja Rabi (1617–1622). Safavid domes were influential on those of other Islamic styles, such as the Mughal architecture of India.

Qajar dynasty 
In the Qajar period (1779–1924), the movement to modern architecture meant less innovation in dome construction. Domes were built over madrasas, such as the 1848 Imam madrasa, or Sultani school, of Kashan, but they have relatively simple appearances and do not use tiled mosaics. The covered markets or bazaars (tīmcās) at Qom and Kashan feature a central dome with smaller domes on either side and elaborate muqarnas. An exaggerated style of onion dome on a short drum, as can be seen at the Shah Cheragh (1852–1853), first appeared in the Qajar period. Domes have remained important in modern mausoleums, such as the tombs of Ḥāfeẓ, Saʿdī, Reza Shah, and Ruhollah Khomeini in the twentieth century. Domed cisterns and icehouses remain common sights in the countryside.

References

Bibliography 

 
 
 
 
 
 
 
 
 
 
 
 
 
 
 
 
 
 
 
 
 
 
 

Domes
Domes